In Anglo-Saxon law, corsned (OE cor, "trial, investigation", + snǽd, "bit, piece"; Latin panis conjuratus), also known as the accursed or sacred morsel, or the morsel of execration, was a type of trial by ordeal that consisted of a suspected person eating a piece of barley bread and cheese totalling about an ounce in weight and consecrated with a form of exorcism as a trial of his innocence. If guilty, it was supposed the bread would produce convulsions and paleness and cause choking. If innocent, it was believed the person could swallow it freely, and the bread would turn to nourishment.
The term dates to before 1000 AD; the laws of Ethelred II reference this practice: "Gif man freondleasne weofod-þen mid tihtlan belecge, ga to corsnæde." 
The ecclesiastical laws of Canute the Great also mention the practice.
According to Isaac D'Israeli, the bread was of unleavened barley, and the cheese was made of ewe's milk in the month of May. 
Writers such as Richard Burn and John Lingard have considered it an imitation of the "water of jealousy" used in the ordeal prescribed in Numbers 5:11-31 for cases of jealousy.

Details 

In this ordeal, the priest wrote the Lord's Prayer on the bread, of which he then weighed out ten pennyweights, and so likewise with the cheese. Under the right foot of the accused, he set a cross of poplar wood, and, holding another cross of the same material over the man's head, threw over his head the theft written on a tablet. He placed the bread and cheese in the mouth of the accused at the same moment and, on doing so, recited the conjuration:

The following prayer and exorcism were also used and ordered to be repeated three times:

Legal historian Richard Burn believed that corsned bread may have originally been the very sacramental bread, but that later, the bishops and clergy would no longer allow the communion bread for such superstitious purposes; they would, however, grant the people to use the same judicial rite, in eating some other morsels of bread, blessed or cursed for the same uses.

It has been asserted that this ordeal was specifically preserved for the clergy. On the other hand, Godwin, Earl of Wessex, is said to have died in this manner in 1053 while denying that he had any role in the death of King Edward the Confessor's brother Alfred in 1036; however, the primary contemporary source for this information is the Croyland Chronicle, attributed to Ingulph (d. 1109), which has since been shown to be a much later forgery.
The practice has long since been gradually abolished. Du Cange observed that the expression, "May this piece of bread choke me!" comes from this custom. Other common phrases of the same origin include "I will take the sacrament upon it!" and "May this morsel be my last!"

See also
Alphitomancy
Witches of Belvoir - One of the women in this case reportedly died after wishing she should choke on her food if she was guilty.

References

Exorcism in Christianity
Breads
Objects used for divination
Ceremonial food and drink
Trial by ordeal